The 2019 Commonwealth Weightlifting Championships took place at the Faleata Sports Complex in Apia, Samoa from 9 to 13 July 2019.

Together with that year's Pacific Games weightlifting competition and Oceania Championships, they were held concurrently as a single event designated the 2019 Pacific Games, Oceania & Commonwealth Championships. Athletes from certain countries were able to contest multiple championships simultaneously (including age-group variants).

Results shown below are for the senior competition only. Junior and youth results are cited here and here respectively.

Medal tables
Ranking by Big (Total result) medals

Ranking by all medals: Big (Total result) and Small (Snatch and Clean & Jerk)

Medal summary

Men

Women

References

External links
Senior results book
Junior results book
Youth results book

Weightlifting competitions
Weightlifting
 
Commonwealth Weightlifting Championships
Commonwealth Weightlifting Championships
International weightlifting competitions hosted by Samoa
Sports competitions in Apia
Commonwealth Weightlifting Championships